Der Hexer (aka The Ringer, The Wizard or The Mysterious Magician) is a 1964 West German black and white mystery film directed by Alfred Vohrer and starring Joachim Fuchsberger. It was part of a very successful series of German films based on the writings of Edgar Wallace and adapted from the 1925 novel titled The Ringer (originally: The Gaunt Stranger). In 1965, a sequel Neues vom Hexer (Again the Ringer) was released.

Cast
 Joachim Fuchsberger as Inspector Higgins
 Heinz Drache as James Wesby
 Margot Trooger as Cora Ann Milton
 René Deltgen as Arthur Milton
 Eddi Arent as Finch
 Siegfried Lowitz as Warren
 Siegfried Schürenberg as Sir John Archibald
 Sophie Hardy as Elise
  as Maurice Messer
 Kurt Waitzmann as Reddingwood
 Karl Lange as Reverend Hopkins
 Karl John as Shelby
 Ann Savo as Jean
 Hilde Sessak as wardress
  as Gwenda Milton
 Tilo von Berlepsch as receptionist
 Inge Keck as flower girl
 Wilhelm Vorwerg as parson
 Josef Wolff as waiter

Production
The film was adapted from the 1925 novel by Edgar Wallace titled The Ringer (originally: The Gaunt Stranger). An earlier German version had been made in the Weimar Republic in 1932, also called Der Hexer.

Shooting took place from 3 June to 10 July 1964 on location in Hamburg and at the Spandau Studios in Berlin.

Release
The FSK gave the film a rating of 16 and up and found it not appropriate for screenings on public holidays.

It premiered on 21 August 1964 at the Alhambra in Düsseldorf.

Parody
In 2004, the film Der Wixxer was released. It parodies German media in general (akin to the Scary Movie series), but puts particular emphasis on parodying the German Edgar Wallace productions of the 1960s and 1970s. Whereas "Der Hexer" translates to witcher or warlock in English, "Der Wixxer" is an intentional misspelling of "der Wichser", a vulgar insult meaning "the wanker".

Other Film Versions
 The Ringer (1928)
 The Ringer (1931)
 The Ringer (Der Hexer, 1932)
 The Gaunt Stranger (1938)
 The Ringer (1952)

References

External links 
 
 Der Hexer at filmportal.de/en

1964 films
1960s mystery thriller films
German mystery thriller films
West German films
1960s German-language films
German black-and-white films
Films directed by Alfred Vohrer
Films based on British novels
Films based on works by Edgar Wallace
Films produced by Horst Wendlandt
Films set in London
Remakes of British films
Constantin Film films
Films shot at Spandau Studios
1960s German films